Hubert Wallace Anslow (March 23, 1926 – July 2, 2006) was a Canadian professional ice hockey left winger. A career minor leaguer, he played in two games with the New York Rangers of the National Hockey League (NHL).

External links

1926 births
2006 deaths
Canadian ice hockey left wingers
Ice hockey people from Ontario
New York Rangers players
New York Rovers players
Sportspeople from Pembroke, Ontario
Canadian expatriate ice hockey players in the United States